Slamannan railway station served the village of Slamannan, Falkirk, Scotland, from 1840 to 1930 on the Slamannan Railway.

History 
The station was opened on 5 August 1840 by the Slamannan Railway. To the west was Binniehall Coke Ovens, as well as its mines, and to the east was Balquhatstone and their mines. The first station was basic; it only had a small timber building on its single platform and was situated to the west of the level crossing. This site later closed and was relocated to the east of the level crossing. It had a goods yard, which also had a goods shed, to the west and a signal box to the south. This station closed and was replaced by a third site. This had a goods yard to the north and a timber station building on its platform. It closed on 1 May 1930.

References

External links 
RAILSCOT - Slamannan

Disused railway stations in Falkirk (council area)
Railway stations in Great Britain opened in 1840
Railway stations in Great Britain closed in 1930
1840 establishments in Scotland
1930 disestablishments in Scotland